Stefan Seeger (born 11 July 1962, in Michelstadt, Hesse) is a German chemist and professor at the University of Zurich in Switzerland.

Biography
Seeger studied chemistry at University of Heidelberg under Technical University Berlin. In 1992, he earned his PhD degree. He later studied Business administration at FernUniversität Hagen. In 1992 he established a research group for biophysical chemistry at the University of Heidelberg. After working as a postdoctoral student at the University of Lund in Sweden, he returned in 1994 to University of Heidelberg to finish his habilitation in 1997. Later that year, he was appointed as a professor for Biosensors at the University of Regensburg. In 1999, he was appointed at University of Zurich to a chair for physical chemistry. In 2001, he was appointed as the director of the Institute for Physical Chemistry.

Career
Seeger invented together with his research group the Supercritical Angle Fluorescence Microscopy method and silicone nanofilaments, such as nanostructured coatings, which show superhydrophobic and superoleophobic properties. He also developed techniques for the manipulation of biological particles. He has so far published more than 100 scientific articles. In addition, he founded Molecular Machines & Industries, Ltd., a supplier of laseroptic systems for pathology, biotechnology and pharmaceutical industry.

He founded a bachelor and master program Chemistry and business administration at University of Zurich, programs teaching high level chemistry and management skills in one program. This programs address professional profiles like general management, logistics, business development, key account manager, etc. in the chemical and related industries.

Awards and recognition 
Seeger's silicone nanofilaments were selected as one of the "100 most important innovations of recent years" and affiliated in the Innovation Pavilion of Expo 2010 in Shanghai.

Seeger is a member of the German Society of Chemists, the Swiss Society of Chemists, the American Chemical Society, the Optical Society of America, a board member of the Paul Karrer Foundation, and vice president of the Scientific Research Foundation of the University of Zurich. He is member of the editorial boards of the Journal of Business Chemistry and Advances in Physical Chemistry.

Selected publications

External links 
www.pci.uzh.ch
www.wichem.uzh.ch
www.stefanseeger.org
Molecular Machines & Industries, Ltd.

1962 births
Living people
People from Michelstadt
21st-century German chemists
Academic staff of the University of Zurich